The Illinois general election was held on November 2, 2004.

Primaries were held March 16, 2004.

Election information

Turnout

Primary election
For the primary election, turnout was 28.97%, with 2,067,824 votes cast.

Turnout by county

General election
For the general election, turnout was 71.34%, with 5,350,493 votes cast.

Turnout by county

Federal elections

United States President

Illinois voted for the Democratic ticket of John Kerry and John Edwards.

This was the fourth consecutive presidential election in which Illinois had voted for the Democratic ticket.

United States Senate

Incumbent first-term Republican Senator Peter Fitzgerald did not seek reelection. Democrat Barack Obama was elected to succeed him.

United States House

All 19 of Illinois’ seats in the United States House of Representatives were up for election in 2004.

The Democratic Party flipped one Republican-held seat, making the composition of Illinois' House delegation 10 Democrats and 9 Republicans.

State elections

State Senate

23 seats of the Illinois Senate were up for election in 2004. Democrats retained their control of the chamber.

State House of Representatives

All of the seats in the Illinois House of Representatives were up for election in 2004. Democrats retained their control of the chamber.

Judicial elections
Judicial elections were held.

Local elections
Local elections were held. These included county elections, such as the Cook County elections.

Notes

References

 
Illinois